WIXC (1060 kHz) is a commercial AM radio station licensed to Titusville, Florida, and serving the Space Coast. It has a Spanish-language Sports Radio format, with programming primarily from the TUDN Radio Network. It is owned by Genesis Communications.  The main radio studio and offices are in Mims, north of Titusville.  A sales office formerly located in the Suntree area of Melbourne was closed.

By day, WIXC is powered at 50,000 watts, the maximum for commercial AM stations.  But because 1060 AM is a clear channel frequency reserved for Class A KYW Philadelphia and XEEP Mexico City, WIXC must reduce power to 5,000 watts at night to avoid interference.  During critical hours, the power is 17,000 watts.  A directional antenna is used at all times.  The transmitter is on West Main Street in the Sweetwater Downs neighborhood in Mims.

History
On , the station first signed on the air.  Its call sign was once WRMF and served as the AM counterpart to WRMF-FM, which at the time broadcast at 98.3 MHz in Titusville.  That station is now WNUE, relocated to 98.1 MHz in Deltona, Florida.  The WRMF call letters are now used for a station in Palm Beach, Florida, at 97.9 MHz.  

In the early 2000s, WIXC had been the Space Coast network affiliate for ESPN Radio through July 31, 2008. It was also the local affiliate for the Tampa Bay Rays games, as well as NASCAR NEXTEL Cup races. WIXC switched from its previous sports talk format to primarily classic country music on August 1, 2008. 

It dumped the classic country format after two months and before one ratings period had taken place when its LMA deal with Whiskey River Broadcasting, Inc. fell apart, and went gone to a news/talk format with a significant amount of brokered paid programming. WIXC continues to air a significant amount of sports content. It became Brevard County's flagship station for live high school football broadcasts in the fall of 2009 but lost that programming to WMEL 1300.

On August 9, 2015, WIXC became AM 1060 WMEL. On October 31, 2016 at noon, WIXC returned to the NewsTalk 1060 brand when "WMEL" moved its programming to WWBC AM 1510.

On February 4, 2019, WIXC flipped to a Regional Mexican format, in a trimulcast with WTMP-FM and WMGG. Just over a month later, WIXC split away from the trimulcast, picking up Spanish-language sports ESPN Deportes Radio.  That network disbanded in September 2019, with WIXC and other affiliates switching to TUDN Radio, another Spanish language sports radio network.

Previous logo

References

External links
WIXC at CFLradio.net

IXC
Sports radio stations in the United States
IXC
Radio stations established in 1957
1957 establishments in Florida